Mark Masselli (born 1951) is an American public health leader and community organizer. In 1972, Masselli co-founded Community Health Center (CHC), the largest Federally Qualified Health Center in Connecticut. He has served as CHC's President and CEO since the organization's founding.  CHC provides primary care services to more than 150,000 patients at 200 sites across Connecticut. CHC was also integral in setting up and running Connecticut’s COVID-19 vaccination sites, administering more than half a million vaccines. Masselli's work conceiving and building CHC is detailed in Peace & Health: How a group of small-town activists and college students set out to change healthcare.

Early life and education
Masselli was born in 1951 in Middletown, Connecticut to Nicholas William Masselli and Ida Marie (Rusconi) Masselli. He attended Xavier High School, graduating in 1969. In 2009, Masselli was awarded an honorary Doctorate of Humane Letters by Wesleyan University.

Community Health Center
In 1972, Masselli founded Community Health Center, Inc. alongside Middletown community activists and students at Wesleyan University, including John Hickenlooper. In his memoir, Senator Hickenlooper describes CHC's beginnings as a free clinic in a walk-up apartment. CHC has evolved into one of the nation's largest and most innovative federally qualified health centers, offering primary medical, dental & behavioral health care and an array of specialty services.

CHC operates with a basic core mission: healthcare is a right, not a privilege. The center makes a special commitment to providing care to the uninsured, underserved, and key populations such as those living with HIV/AIDS.

During the 1990s, supported by federal funding for FQHCs, CHC expanded to midsize cities across Connecticut, including New London, Meriden, and New Britain. The center now operates 16 large community clinics, a national training and technology development arm, and 185 school-based health centers.

In 2021, CHC set up the largest mass vaccination site in Connecticut in East Hartford. CHC set up additional mass vaccination sites in Stamford and Middletown. In 2022, CHC received funding from the American Rescue Plan to expand virtual appointment options.

Podcast

Masselli and cohost Margaret Flinter launched Conversations on Health Care on Wesleyan University's radio station WESU in 2009. The first guest was Speaker of the United States House of Representatives Nancy Pelosi. Over the years, the show has been distributed nationally on NPR, as a podcast, a video series, and through major news outlets in New York City and Washington, DC. Guests have included leaders in health care and politics such as Anthony Fauci, Mark Cuban, and Francis Collins.

Professional life

Masselli's vision of health care expands beyond medical offices. In her book on community renewal, singer-songwriter Dar Williams describes the work Masselli and his wife have done to strengthen the community fabric of Middletown. In 2000, Masselli, together with his wife, established Vinnie's Jump and Jive, a community dance hall, to encourage families to participate in healthy community activities together. Masselli received the key to the city of Middletown in 2022.

Masselli serves as treasurer of the board for the School-Based Health Alliance, board chair of the National Institute for Medical Assistant Advancement, and board chair of ConferMED. He also serves on the board of the National Nurse Practitioner Residency and Fellowship Training Consortium and is Vice President of the Goodspeed Opera House Board of Trustees.

References

1951 births
American health activists
People from Middletown, Connecticut
Wesleyan University alumni
Living people
American health care chief executives